Old Castle in Żywiec is a castle located in Żywiec, Silesian Voivodeship, Poland.

History 
A castle (cum castro) in Żywiec was first mentioned in 1467, as destroyed by an army, under Casimir IV Jagiellon's command against the House of Komorowski, with the Korczak Coat of Arms, recorded by Jan Długosz. However it is not certain whether it denoted the castle in the town or a fortifications on a nearby Grójec hill. Archaeological scrutiny dates the origins of the castle in the first half of the 15th century. A later expansion was constructed in 1567 by the House of Komorowski. Under the ownership and will of Jan Spytek Komorowski, during the castle's expansion a Renaissance style courtyard was built, which is still untouched in its current form.

Since 2005, the Old Castle in Żywiec hosts the City Museum in Żywiec (Muzeum Miejskie w Żywcu, Polish). The Old Castle's permanent exhibition includes an ethnographical exhibition - which completes the Wooden Architecture Trail in the Silesian Voivodeship, in Poland.

Notes

References
 

Buildings and structures completed in 1567
Castles in Silesian Voivodeship
Żywiec County